Puerto Rican rapper Tego Calderón has released four studio albums, one compilation album, one mixtape albums, and fifteen singles.

On November 1, 2002, Tego released his debut album El Abayarde including the singles "Abayarde", "Pa' Que Retozen", "Cambumbo", "Guasa Guasa" and "Al Natural".

His second album The Underdog/El Subestimado was released on August 29, 2006. The album had four singles: "Los Maté", "Chillin'", "Cuando Baila Reggaeton" and "Llora, Llora".

Tego released his third studio album, El Abayarde Contraataca, in 2007, featuring the singles "Tradicional A Lo Bravo", "Quitarte To'" and "Ni Fu Ni Fa".

As of 2012, Tego is set to release his fourth studio album, El Que Sabe, Sabe, which features the single "Pegaito a la Pared".

Albums

Studio

Mixtapes and compilations

Singles

Solo

Featured

Collaborations / remixes
 "Amor, Amor" (Roselyn Sánchez feat. Tego Calderón)
 "Al Natural (Remix)" (Tego Calderón feat. Yandel)
 "Oye Mi Canto" (N.O.R.E. feat. Nina Sky, Tego Calderón, Gem Star & Big Mato)
 "Yeah (Usher feat. Lil Jon, Ludacris & Tego Calderón)
 "Sin Exagerar"  (Calle 13 feat. Tego Calderon)
 "Se Van" (Voltio feat. Tego Calderón)
 "Mirame (Remix)" (Daddy Yankee feat. Tego Calderón & Deevanee)
 "Lean Back" (Terror Squad feat. Tego Calderón)
 "La Calle Me Lo Pidió" (Wisin & Yandel feat. Tego Calderon) 
 "Quítate Tú Pa' Ponerme Yo" (Eddie Dee feat. Gallego, Vico C, Tego Calderón, Voltio, Zion & Lennox, Daddy Yankee, Ivy Queen, Johnny Prez, Nicky Jam, & Wiso G)
 "Quítate Tú Pa' Ponerme Yo (Salsa)" (Eddie Dee feat. Gallego, Vico C, Tego Calderón, Voltio, Zion & Lennox, Daddy Yankee, Ivy Queen, Johnny Prez, Nicky Jam, & Wiso G)
 "Bandoleros" (Don Omar feat. Tego Calderón)
 "I Wanna Love You (Akon feat. Snoop Dogg & Tego Calderón)
 "Ghetto (Remix)" (Akon feat. Tego Calderón)
 "We Got The Crown" (Aventura feat. Tego Calderón)
 "Vamonos Al Club" (Zion feat. Tego Calderón) 
 "Pegaito a la Pared (Remix)" (Tego Calderón feat. Plan B)
  "Che Che Cole" & "El Amor Es Un Casino" (Víctor Manuelle feat. Tego Calderón)
 "Conexión Puerto Rico" (Cartel de Santa feat. Tego Calderón)
 "La Muralla (Puya feat. Tito Auger, Tego Calderón, Mimi Maura & El Topo)
 "Zun Zun Rompiendo Caderas (Remix)" (Wisin & Yandel feat. Pitbull & Tego Calderón)
 "Es Un Secreto (Remix)" (Plan B feat. Tego Calderón & Akon)
 "Original G's (Ñengo Flow feat. Tego Calderón)
 "Zapatito Roto" (Plan B feat. Tego Calderón)
 "Quiero Hacertelo (J Alvarez feat. Tego Calderón)
 "Las Nenas Lindas" (Remix) (Jowell & Randy feat. Tego Calderón)
"Punkie" (Remix)

References 

Discographies of Puerto Rican artists
Reggaeton discographies